Ancient Semitic religion encompasses the polytheistic religions of the Semitic peoples from the ancient Near East and Northeast Africa. Since the term Semitic itself represents a rough category when referring to cultures, as opposed to languages, the definitive bounds of the term "ancient Semitic religion" are only approximate.

Semitic traditions and their pantheons fall into regional categories: Canaanite religions of the Levant including among them the polytheistic ancient Hebrew religion of the Israelites; the Sumerian–inspired Assyro-Babylonian religion of Mesopotamia; the religion of Carthage; and Arabian polytheism.

Semitic polytheism possibly transitioned into Abrahamic monotheism by way of the god El, whose name "El" אל, or elohim אֱלֹהִים‎ is a word for "god" in Hebrew, cognate to Arabic ʼilāh إله, which means god.

Akkad, Assyria and Babylonia

The five planets visible to the naked eye and the sun and moon are connected with the chief gods of the Babylonian pantheon. A list now held in the British Museum arranges the sevenfold planetary group in the following order:
Sin (the Moon)
Shamash (the Sun)
Marduk (Jupiter)
Ishtar (Venus)
Ninurta (Saturn)
Nabu (Mercury)
Nergal (Mars)

The religion of the Assyrian Empire (sometimes called Ashurism) centered on Ashur, patron deity of the city of Assur, and Ishtar, patroness of Nineveh. The last positively recorded worship of Ashur and other Assyrian gods dates back to the 3rd century AD.

Ashur, the patron deity of the eponymous capital from the Late Bronze Age, was in constant rivalry with Marduk, the patron deity of Babylon. In Assyria, Ashur eventually superseded Marduk, even becoming the husband of Ishtar.

The major Assyro-Babylonian and Akkadian gods were:

Ashur/(Anshar)], patron of Assur
Ishtar, (Astarte), goddess of love and war and patroness of Nineveh
Nabu: god of writing and scribes
Nergal: god of the Underworld
Tiamat: sea goddess
Samnuha
Kubaba
Marduk
Enlil
Ninlil
Nisroch
Hanbi: father of Pazuzu
Anu, supreme divinity of the Heavens
Ea, Sumerian Enki: god of crafts
Kishar
Sin / Suen, Sumerian Nanna: moon god
Ishara
Shamash: sun god
Adad/Hadad
Dagan/Dagon
Bel
Tammuz

Major Assyro-Babylonian demons and heroes were:
Adapa (Oannes)
Gilgamesh
Lugalbanda
Lilitu
Pazuzu
Ninurta

Canaan

The Canaanite religion was practiced by people living in the ancient Levant throughout the Bronze Age and Iron Age. Until the excavation (1928 onwards) of the city of Ras Shamra (also known as Ugarit) in Northern Syria and the discovery of its Bronze Age archive of clay tablet alphabetic cuneiform texts, scholars knew little about Canaanite religious practice. Papyrus seems to have been the preferred writing material for scribes at the time. Unlike the papyrus documents found in Egypt, ancient papyri in the Levant have often simply decayed from exposure to the humid Mediterranean climate. As a result, the accounts in the Bible became the primary sources of information on ancient Canaanite religion. Supplementing the Biblical accounts, several secondary and tertiary Greek sources have survived, including Lucian of Samosata's treatise De Dea Syria (The Syrian Goddess, 2nd century CE), fragments of the Phoenician History of Sanchuniathon as preserved by Philo of Byblos (c. 64 – 141 CE), and the writings of Damascius ( 458 – after 538). Recent study of the Ugaritic material has uncovered additional information about the religion, supplemented by inscriptions from the Levant and Tel Mardikh archive (excavated in the early 1960s).

Like other peoples of the ancient Near East, the Canaanites were polytheistic, with families typically focusing worship on ancestral household gods and goddesses while acknowledging the existence of other deities such as Baal, Anath, and El. Kings also played an important religious role and in certain ceremonies, such as the sacred marriage of the New Year Festival; Canaanites may have revered their kings as gods.

According to the pantheon, known in Ugarit as 'ilhm (Elohim) or the children of El (compare the Biblical "sons of God"), the creator deity called El, fathered the other deities. In the Greek sources he was married to Beruth (Beirut, the city). The pantheon was supposedly obtained by Philo of Byblos from Sanchuniathon of Berythus (Beirut). The marriage of the deity with the city seems to have biblical parallels with the stories that link Melkart with Tyre, Yahweh with Jerusalem, and Tanit and Baal Hammon with Carthage. El Elyon is mentioned (as God Most High) in Genesis 14.18–19 as the God whose priest was Melchizedek, king of Salem.

Philo states that the union of El Elyon and his consort resulted in the birth of Uranus and Ge (Greek names for Heaven and Earth). This closely parallels the opening verse of the Hebrew Bible, Genesis 1:1—"In the beginning God (Elohim) created the Heavens (Shemayim) and the Earth" (Eretz). It also parallels the story of the Babylonian Anunaki gods.

Abrahamic religions

Scholars have demonstrated that the Enuma Elish influenced the Genesis creation narrative. The Epic of Gilgamesh influenced the Genesis flood narrative. The Sumerian myth of Enmerkar and the Lord of Aratta also had influence on the Tower of Babel myth in Genesis. Some writers trace the story of Esther to Babylonian roots.

El Elyon also appears in Balaam's story in Numbers and in Moses song in Deuteronomy 32.8. The Masoretic Texts suggest:
When the Most High ('Elyōn) divided to the nations their inheritance, he separated the sons of man (Ādām); he set the bounds of the people according to the number of the sons of Israel.

Rather than "sons of Israel", the Septuagint, the Greek Old Testament, suggests the "angelōn theou," or "angels of God", and a few versions even have huiōn theou (sons of God). The Dead Sea Scrolls version of this suggests that there were in fact 70 sons of the Most High God sent to rule over the 70 nations of the Earth. This idea of the 70 nations of Earth, each ruled over by one of the Elohim (sons of God), is also found in Ugaritic texts. The Arslan Tash inscription suggests that each of the 70 sons of El Elyon was bound to their people by a covenant. Thus, Crossan translates:
The Eternal One ('Olam) has made a covenant oath with us,
Asherah has made (a pact) with us.
And all the sons of El,
And the great council of all the Holy Ones (Qedesh).
With oaths of Heaven and Ancient Earth.

See also

Ancient Egyptian religion
Arabian mythology
History of Judaism
Mandaeism
Moses and Monotheism
Names of God in Judaism
Origins of Judaism
Prehistoric religion
Religions of the ancient Near East
Semitic Neopaganism

References

Further reading
Donald A. Mackenzie, Myths of Babylonia and Assyria (1915).
Moscati, Sabatino (1968), The World of the Phoenicians (Phoenix Giant)
Ribichini, Sergio "Beliefs and Religious Life" in Moscati Sabatino (1988), The Phoenicians (by L.B. Tauris in 2001)
Thophilus G. Pinches, The Religion of Babylonia and Assyria, The World Wide School, Seattle (2000)

External links

 
Phoenician religion